This is a list of number-one songs in 1980 on the Italian charts compiled weekly by the Italian Hit Parade Singles Chart.

Chart history

Number-one artists

References

1980
1980 in Italian music
1980 record charts